Juan Gabriel Pareja (born December 24, 1978) is an American actor. Born and raised in Houston, Texas, to parents who immigrated from Colombia, Pareja is a graduate of the Tisch School of the Arts at New York University.

Pareja's film credits have included The Three Burials of Melquiades Estrada in 2005, The Mist in 2007, From Mexico with Love in 2009 and Machete in 2010. He was cast in the supporting role as Morales in the television series, The Walking Dead, which premiered in 2010.

Filmography

Film
 The Three Burials of Melquiades Estrada (2005)
 The Mist (2007)
 Soul Men (2008) 
 From Mexico with Love (2009)
 Machete (2010)
 Fort Bliss (2013)

Television

References

External links

MovieMikes.com: Interview with Juan Gabriel Pareja
Juan Gabriel Pareja official site

1978 births
American male film actors
American male television actors
Tisch School of the Arts alumni
American people of Colombian descent
Male actors from Houston
Living people
Hispanic and Latino American male actors
21st-century American male actors